Hocus Pocus: Original Motion Picture Soundtrack is the score for the 1993 Walt Disney Pictures Halloween comedy film of the same name. It was composed and conducted by John Debney.

The soundtrack was first officially released on October 1, 2013, over twenty years after the film's release, by Intrada Records. The album included the complete film score along with bonus material.

Background 
In 1993, Debney's agency released a promotional CD containing 19 tracks from the film, in hopes of a future commercial release. However, it did not come to fruition, and the promo has since become a rare collector's item. The film did not have a soundtrack album available to the public until Intrada Records released their special complete edition in late 2013.
 
As a result of the score being cut from its original running time of over 60 minutes down to 43 minutes in Debney's promo, as well as all the music from the prologue sequence being removed, many bootleg recordings of the score were leaked online, most containing all the music from the film in addition to never-before-heard alternates, some of which did not appear on the official release.

The music was conducted by Debney and orchestrated by Brad Detcher and Don Davis. James Horner was originally slated to score the film, but became unavailable at the last minute, so Debney had only two weeks to score the 96-minute film. Prior to the production of the film, Horner wrote a two-minute theme for Sarah (commonly known as "Come Little Children"), which ended up being used in the film, and featured in Intrada's edition of the score (officially titled "Sarah's Theme").

The song "Almost Unreal" by Roxette was written for the film, hence the lyric "I love when you do that hocus pocus to me". At the last minute the producers replaced them with En Vogue, though they too were ultimately dropped. "Almost Unreal" ended up being used for the film adaptation of the Nintendo game series Super Mario Bros., which was released two months prior.

Track listing

Unassembled cue list 
 "Main Title"
 "Main Title Pt. 2"
 "Garden of Magic No. 1"
 "Thackery Follows Emily"
 "Witches' Lair Pt. 1"
 "Witches' Lair Pt. 2"
 "Witches' Lair Pt. 3"
 "To the Stake"
 "Death to the Witches"
 "Meeting Allison"
 "Max Loses Shoes"
 "The Closet"
 "Hallowe'en"
 "Max and Dani"
 "Divertimento #17 in D, K. 334"
 "To the Witches' House We Go"
 "What's That?"
 "The Black Candle"
 "The Girls Come Home"
 "Escape from the Witches' Lair"
 "Witches on a Rampage"
 "Get the Book!"
 "Binx's Story"
 "Graveyard Attack"
 "Evil Intent"
 "The Calming Circle"
 "Winnie Wants Children"
 "The Master"
 "Fingers"
 "Hallowe'en Holiday"
 "Springing the Trap - Part 1"
 "Springing the Trap - Part 2"
 "Up in Smoke Aftermath"
 "Is It Safe?"
 "Ernie Goes Too Far"
 "Winnie's Lament"
 "Witches Flight"
 "Witches Take Dani"
 "Sarah's Theme" (Garden of Magic No. 2)
 "Max Fools the Witches"
 "Winnie Catches Up"
 "Billy Speaks"
 "Witches Capture Dani Pt. 1"
 "Witches Capture Dani Pt. 2"
 "Witches Demise/Resurrection"
 "String Tremolo" (Bridge to End Song)
 "End Credits Pt. 1"
 "End Credits Pt. 2"

References 

1993 soundtrack albums
2013 soundtrack albums
Intrada Records soundtracks
Walt Disney Records soundtracks
John Debney soundtracks
Hocus Pocus
Disney film soundtracks